The WAGR R class was a class of 4-4-0 steam locomotives used by the Western Australian Government Railways (WAGR) between 1897 and 1953.  All members of the class were built by Dübs & Co.

See also

 Rail transport in Western Australia
 List of Western Australian locomotive classes
 WAGR R class (diesel) – a class of diesel-electric locomotives also designated as the WAGR R class

References

Notes

Cited works

External links

Dübs locomotives
Railway locomotives introduced in 1897
R WAGR class
4-4-0 locomotives
3 ft 6 in gauge locomotives of Australia
Scrapped locomotives
Passenger locomotives